Andreas Bech (born 26 January 1969) is a German lightweight rower. He won a gold medal at the 1996 World Rowing Championships in Motherwell with the lightweight men's eight.

References

1969 births
Living people
German male rowers
World Rowing Championships medalists for Germany
Rowers at the 2004 Summer Olympics
Olympic rowers of Germany